Gabai is a surname. For people with the surname spelled Gabay, see Gabay. Notable people with this surname include:

David Gabai, American mathematician
Eliyahu Gabai (born 1943), Israeli politician
Sasson Gabai, Israeli actor
Yisroel Meir Gabbai
Gabai, village of KpK Pakistan

Maghrebi Jewish surnames
Sephardic surnames
Gabai: Village of KpK Pakistan